Adalberto Luis Brandoni (born 18 April 1940) is an Argentine actor and politician.

Biography

Brandoni was born in Dock Sud, a port community east of Avellaneda. He debuted on the stage in 1962, television in 1963, and on film in 1966. He joined the National Comedy Theater in 1964 under the direction of Luisa Vehil.

Politically active in the centrist Radical Civic Union (UCR) party, he also served as cultural policy adviser for President Raúl Alfonsín (1983–89), and was elected to the Argentine Chamber of Deputies in 1993, where he served until 2001. He was an unsuccessful Argentine Senate candidate for the UCR in 2005, and for Vice Governor of Buenos Aires Province, with nominee Ricardo Alfonsín, in 2007.

An actor with extensive film, television and theatre credits, he portrayed leading roles in acclaimed pictures such as La tregua (1974), Juan que reía (1976), Darse cuenta (1984), Esperando la carroza (1985), Made in Argentina (1986), Cien veces no debo (1990), Convivencia (1993), Una sombra ya pronto serás (1994), De mi barrio con amor (1995), and Los pasos perdidos (2001).

His career remained strong during 2011: among his notable theatre credits was his portrayal of former President Arturo Illia; and his notable television credits included a costarring role in Telefé's sitcom El hombre de tu vida, together with Guillermo Francella and directed by Juan José Campanella. He also starred in Gastón Duprat & Mariano Cohn's comedy film Mi obra maestra (2018), together again with Guillermo Francella. He is currently set to star in the Star+ TV series Nada, which will be released in 2023. Cohn & Duprat wrote and directed the series, which features a supporting cast that includes Robert De Niro.

Brandoni also served in numerous actors' guilds, including the International Federation of Actors (IFA) as its Vice President, between 1974 and 2004.

Awards 
Brandoni has won several awards, including four Martín Fierro Awards (1970, 1993, 1995 and 2017); and two Argentine Film Critics Association Silver Condor awards for Best Actor for his roles in Seré cualquier cosa pero te quiero and Convivencia.

Personal life 
Brandoni was married to actress Marta Bianchi, and in 2007 married Mónica López.

Controversies 
In July 2017, the Argentine Association of Actors issued a harsh statement criticizing Brandoni for some statements made at the time on the television program Intratables, where he described as "verse" (meaning "false") the current denomination of "civil-military" regarding Argentina's last dictatorship, while denying there was any important civilian participation or decision-making in the military government of the dictatorship.

References

External links
 
 

1940 births
Living people
Argentine people of Italian descent
People from Avellaneda
Argentine male actors
Radical Civic Union politicians
Members of the Argentine Chamber of Deputies elected in Buenos Aires Province